Deh-e Sefid or Deh Sefid or Deh Safid may refer to:

Hamadan Province
Deh Sefid, Hamadan, a village in Asadabad County

Kermanshah Province
Deh Sefid, Kermanshah, a village in Kermanshah County
Deh Sefid, Sarpol-e Zahab, a village in Sarpol-e Zahab County

Lorestan Province
Deh Sefid Darvish, a village in Lorestan Province, Iran
Deh Sefid, Borujerd, a village in Lorestan Province, Iran
Deh Sefid, Khorramabad, a village in Lorestan Province, Iran
Deh Sefid Karim, a village in Lorestan Province, Iran
Deh-e Sefid Kan Sorkh, a village in Lorestan Province, Iran
Deh-e Sefid Salianeh, a village in Lorestan Province, Iran
Deh Sefid-e Olya, a village in Lorestan Province, Iran
Deh Sefid-e Sofla, a village in Lorestan Province, Iran
Deh Sefid-e Vosta, a village in Lorestan Province, Iran
Kaveh-ye Olya (Deh Sefid), a village in Lorestan Province, Iran

Markazi Province
Deh Sefid, Markazi, a village in Shazand County

South Khorasan Province
Deh-e Sefid, South Khorasan, a village in South Khorasan Province, Iran